Catocala faustina is a moth of the  family Erebidae. It is found from Colorado west to California and north through Washington to British Columbia. It has also been reported in Idaho, Montana, Nevada, Oregon and Utah.

The wingspan is about 58 mm. Adults are on wing from September to October depending on the location. There is probably one generation per year.

The larvae feed on Salix species.

Subspecies
Catocala faustina faustina Strecker, 1873
Catocala faustina cleopatra Strecker, 1874
Catocala faustina allusa Hulst, 1884

The latter two are often considered distinct species, leaving C: faustina monotypic.

References

External links
Species info

faustina
Moths of North America
Moths described in 1873
Taxa named by Herman Strecker